Bill Pankow is an American film editor with more than 40 film credits dating from 1982. Pankow has edited nine films for director Brian De Palma commencing with Body Double in 1984. His other credits include:

Body Double (1984)
The Untouchables (1987)
Parents (1989)
The Comfort of Strangers (1990)
The Funeral (1996)
Snake Eyes (1998)
Femme Fatale (2002)
The Black Dahlia (2006)
Trespass (2011)
Domino (2019)

Pankow is a member of the American Cinema Editors.

References

External links

American Cinema Editors
Living people
1952 births
American film editors